An epergne is a type of table centerpiece that is usually made of silver but may be made of any metal, glass or porcelain.

An epergne generally has a large central "bowl" or basket sitting on three to five feet.  From this center "bowl" radiate branches supporting small baskets, dishes, or candleholders. There may be between two and seven branches. Epergnes were traditionally made from silver, however from around the start of the 20th century, glass was also employed.

Name
The derivation is probably from the French épargne meaning "saving," the idea being that dinner guests were saved the trouble of passing dishes (although an epergne in French is called a surtout). In addition the word épargne in French can also mean "spare", another way of saying "to save", or a spare, meaning "reserve or extra".

Usage
An epergne may be used to hold any type of food or dessert. It may also be used as a designer object to hold candles, flowers or ornaments for a holiday.  In traditional use, an epergne is a fancy way to display side dishes, fruit, or sweetmeats; it can be used for chips, dips, or other finger foods.

References

External links 
 

Serving and dining
Tableware